Turbonilla iseborae is a species of sea snail, a marine gastropod mollusk in the family Pyramidellidae, the pyrams and their allies.

Distribution
This species occurs in the Gulf of Guinea, West Africa.

References

External links
 To Encyclopedia of Life
 To World Register of Marine Species

iseborae
Gastropods described in 2010